Baxi is part of BDR Thermea, one of Europe's largest manufacturers and distributors of domestic and commercial water and space heating systems.

Baxi employs 6,400 people throughout Europe, with a turnover exceeding €1.2 billion. The group has significant market shares across all major continental territories and in the United Kingdom. It is also expanding into new markets such as Romania and Argentina and already has a direct presence in Russia, China and the Czech Republic. It has a presence of joint venture partnerships in developing locations, like Turkey.

Today, BDR Thermea owns and sells some of the leading brands in the European market for heating products.

It is known under various pseudonyms worldwide, including Chappée and Ideal Standard in France, Roca in Spain, and Broetje in Germany.

Baxi operates four sites in the UK: Warwick, Preston, Norwich and Wokingham. There are also numerous training centers nationwide, including Dartford and Godmanchester.

Its investment is based on boiler products and renewable technologies, including solar thermal hot water systems, ground source heat pumps, air source heat pumps, biomass boilers and micro combined heat and power with baxi-innotech.

History
The group can trace its beginnings back over 150 years to Richard Baxendale, an iron founder, who began the Baxendale Company in 1866, based in Preston in Lancashire. Since the company was founded, it has been responsible for many of the key engineering breakthroughs which have revolutionized the boiler market.

The current Baxi Group was formed in November 2000 after the merger of the heating interests of Newmond plc (formerly the European Building Products Division of Williams Holding plc) and Baxi Holdings plc. 
	
The company's main shareholders are now private equity investors, BC Partners and Electra.

Baxi International
Baxi International, a division of the Baxi Group, was formed in 2002 to manage the group's international sales, marketing, and after-sales activities in more than 70 countries across the world.

Joint Ventures
Strategic acquisitions and joint ventures since 2000 have included Baymak (Turkey joint venture), Baxi Belgium, SenerTec (combined heat and power), European Fuel Cell (fuel cell technology) and Roca Heating, the market leader in residential heating equipment in Spain and Portugal.

In October 2004, Baxi Holding Ltd sold the Aqualisa division, to a management buy-out backed by CBPE Capital for £82.5 million.

Baxi in England

Preston
The company continues to be a major employer in Preston at the manufacturing and testing facility.

Baxi is former owner and sponsor of Preston North End, having taken over the club in summer 1994 when it had been in serious financial difficulty for several years. Baxi's chief executive Bryan Gray became club chairman. One of the first announcements by the new board was that Deepdale, until then a dilapidated stadium owned by Preston Council, would be upgraded into a modern stadium after the injection of extra funds by Baxi and from a subsequent new share issue.

Gray resigned as club chairman in the autumn of 2001 and Baxi declined to appoint a replacement, so it was immediately clear that the company intended to sell its holding in the club. By this time, three of the four new stands at Deepdale had been rebuilt and reopened but work on the fourth was delayed by several years following the collapse of ITV Digital, which cost the club an income of £4.6 million over the next two years (the stand was finally opened in 2008). The club was initially bought by existing directors and sponsors but has subsequently been taken over by Lancashire businessman Trevor Hemmings.

Warwick
The company's contact centre currently employs some 100 call handlers working from offices based in Warwick. Handling customer enquiries relating to heating system breakdowns, the contact centre also provides a technical helpdesk and handles approximately 6,000 calls per day.

Merge
In July 2010, the group agreed to merge with Netherlands business rival De Dietrich Remeha to form BDR Thermea.

Baxi partnership
It is Britain's largest employee owned manufacturing company. The original company was left in a trust for the benefit of its employees. The trust required an act of parliament specially to set it up because UK trust laws placed restrictions on trust and the original intentions of the trust not being compatible. This resulted in the Baxi Partnership Limited Trusts Act 2000 being enacted.

The BDR Thermea employs more than 5,400 people throughout Europe with a turnover of £850 million.

Products 

 Baxi Toolbelt app
 Benchmark Checklist app

UK subsidiaries and locations
Andrews Water Heaters – Wokingham
Baxi – Preston
Baxi Customer Support (Servicing) – Warwick
Baxi Genuine Parts – Warwick
Elson – Preston
Heatrae Sadia – Preston
Main – Warwick
Potterton – Warwick
Potterton Commercial – Wokingham
Santon – Preston
Remeha Commercial – Wokingham Not a subsidiary of Baxi

Overseas subsidiaries and locations
BAXI – Bassano del Grappa (Italy)
Baymak (Turkey joint venture),
CSE (now renamed Baxi Belgium),
SenerTec (Combined Heat and Power specialists),
European Fuel Cell
Roca Heating (2005), in Spain and Portugal.
Brötje in Germany
Chappée in France

See also
 Top Track 100 – Baxi is No. 52 in the list of biggest private companies.

References

 Telegraph article listing Baxi & new turnover figure

External links
 Baxi Website
 Employ Ownership Trust variation details

Manufacturing companies of the United Kingdom
Employee-owned companies of the United Kingdom
Companies based in Preston
Private equity portfolio companies
Heating, ventilation, and air conditioning companies
Companies based in Warwick
British brands
Preston North End F.C.